The Second Epistle of John is a book of the New Testament attributed to John the Evangelist, traditionally thought to be the author of the other two epistles of John, and the Gospel of John (though this is disputed).  Most modern scholars believe this is not John the Apostle, but in general there is no consensus as to the identity of this person or group. (See Authorship of the Johannine works.)

Second John and Third John are the two shortest books in the Bible. The shortest book in the English language is different depending on which translation (version) one reads. For example, in the New International Version 2 John is the shortest book with only 302 words but in the King James Version (Authorized Version) 3 John is the shortest with only 295 words. However, Second John has the fewest verses in the Bible with only 1 chapter made up of only 13 verses.

Composition 

The language of this epistle is remarkably similar to 3 John. It is therefore suggested by a few that a single author composed both of these letters. The traditional view contends that all the letters are by the hand of John the Apostle, and the linguistic structure, special vocabulary, and polemical issues all lend toward this theory.

Also significant is the clear warning against paying heed to those who say that Jesus was not a flesh-and-blood figure: "For many deceivers are entered into the world, who confess not that Jesus Christ is come in the flesh." This establishes that, from the time the epistle was first written, there were those who had docetic Christologies, believing that the human person of Jesus was actually pure spirit or not come at all.

Alternatively, the letter's acknowledgment and rejection of gnostic theology may reveal a later date of authorship than orthodox Christianity claims. This can not be assured by a simple study of the context. Gnosticism's beginnings and its relationship to Christianity are poorly dated, due to an insufficient corpus of literature relating the first interactions between the two religions. It vehemently condemns such anti-corporeal attitudes, which also indicates that those taking such unorthodox positions were either sufficiently vocal, persuasive, or numerous enough to warrant rebuttal in this form. Adherents of gnosticism were most numerous during the second and third centuries.

Interpretation of "The Lady"

The text is addressed to "the elect lady and her children" (some interpretations translate this phrase as "elder lady and her children"), and closes with the words, "The children of thy elect sister greet thee." The person addressed is commended for her piety, and is warned against false teachers.

The lady has often been seen as a metaphor for the church, the church being the body of believers as a whole and as local congregations. The children would be members of that local congregation. The writer also includes a greeting from another church in the final verse, "The children of thy elect sister greet thee." The term the elect was a fairly common term for those who believe in the gospel and follow Christ. Scholar Amos Wilder supports this view, saying the content of the epistle itself shows it was addressed to the church as a whole rather than a single person.

Another interpretation holds that the letter is addressed to a specific individual. Athanasius proposed that Kyria, the Greek word used here which means lady, was actually a name. The Young's Literal Translation of the Bible translates it this way. It is also possible it refers to an individual but simply does not use her name. One theory is that the letter refers to Mary, mother of Jesus; Jesus had entrusted his "beloved disciple" with Mary's life when Jesus was on the cross (John 19:26–27). Mary was likewise never referred to by name in John's gospel. Such an interpretation would assume a much earlier date of composition than modern scholars have suggested.

See also 
 Authorship of the Johannine works

Notes

References

External links

Online translations of the Second Epistle of John:
 Online Bible at GospelHall.org
 KJV
 NIV
  Various versions

Online articles on the Second Epistle of John:
 The Second General Epistle of John from Kretzmann's Popular Commentary of the Bible
 An Exegesis of 2 John 7–11 by Mark A. Paustian

 
2nd-century Christian texts
John 2
Christian anti-Gnosticism
John2
Johannine literature
Elect lady
Antilegomena